Kim Ja-ok (October 11, 1951 – November 16, 2014) was a South Korean actress. Kim was born in Busan in 1951. Kim dropped out of Hanyang University majoring in Film. Kim started her acting career after admitted to a public recruit by MBC TV. During the early period of the 1970s, she mainly starred in TV series, while in the late 1970s, Kim focused on film. Kim gained a popularity for her cheerful depiction on a woman of the new generation such as Sinbu ilgi.  Her last husband was singer, Oh Seung Geun.  Her brother was announcer, Kim Tae Ok.

On November 16, 2014, it was reported by Yonhap News that Kim Ja-ok had died from lung cancer.

Filmography
*Note; the whole list is referenced.

Films

Television series

Album discography
Princess is Lonely (1996)

Awards
1975 11th Baeksang Arts Awards : Best TV Actress (수선화 MBC)
1975 11th Baeksang Arts Awards : Most Popular TV Actress 
1976 12th Baeksang Arts Awards : Best Film Actress (보통여자(김수현의 보통여자))
1979 15th Baeksang Arts Awards : Best Film Actress (목마위의 여자)
2011 KBS Drama Awards : Excellence Award, Actress in a Serial Drama (Ojakgyo Family)
2014 MBC Drama Awards : Achievement Award
2014 SBS Drama Awards : Lifetime Achievement Award
2014 KBS Drama Awards : Achievement Award

References

External links
 
 

1951 births
2014 deaths
Musicians from Busan
South Korean women singers
South Korean film actresses
South Korean television actresses
Trot singers
South Korean television presenters
South Korean broadcasters
South Korean women television presenters
VJs (media personalities)
Deaths from lung cancer in South Korea
Hanyang University alumni
Best Actress Paeksang Arts Award (film) winners
Best Actress Paeksang Arts Award (television) winners